Acer binzayedii, commonly known as algodoncillo, is a species of flowering plant in the genus Acer. It is endemic to Jalisco State in western Mexico. It has a limited range, and is considered Critically Endangered.

Description
Acer binzayedii is a large tree, growing to between 20 and 30 meters in height. It flowers between December and January and sets fruit from March.

Taxonomy
The formal description of the species reads as follows: "The specific epithet honours a philanthropist committed to the protection of the environment and the preservation of species, His Highness Sheikh Mohammed bin Zayed Al Nahyan, Crown Prince of Abu Dhabi and Deputy Supreme Commander of the United Arab Emirates Armed Forces. Through his philanthropic endowment, the first author was able to conduct phylogeographic and taxonomic studies of Acer in tropical America; this research led to the discovery and recognition of this new species."

Until 2017 it was considered a western population of Acer skutchii.

Range and habitat
Acer binzayedii is native to ravine montane cloud forests in the Sierra de Manantlán of western Jalisco State. It known from two remnant populations, each less than two hectares in area, between 1,790 and 1,880 meters elevation. Mean average temperature is 18.5° C. The two cloud forest remnants are separated by pine–oak forest.

It grows on intermediate rocks and cambisol soil. It is typically found in association with Carpinus tropicalis, Cornus disciflora, Dendropanax arboreus, Ostrya virginiana, and Quercus salicifolia. A. binzayedii is susceptible to fire.

Conservation
Human disturbance is causing species' habitat to decline in area, extent and quality. The species also suffers from low genetic diversity.

The population was formerly larger, but only 90 mature trees have been observed, along with a larger number of young trees.

References

binzayedii
Plants described in 2017
Flora of the Trans-Mexican Volcanic Belt
Trees of Jalisco
Flora of the Sierra Madre del Sur
Endemic flora of Mexico